Lakshmia pandava is a species of moth in the family Cossidae that lives in Thailand.

References

Moths described in 2013
Zeuzerinae